Rud Gavaber (also Romanized as Rūd Gavāber and Rūd-e Gavāber; also known as Rūd-e Gavāpar) is a village in Shabkhus Lat Rural District, Rankuh District, Amlash County, Gilan Province, Iran. At the 2006 census, its population was 132, in 31 families.

References 

Populated places in Amlash County